Speed Racer is a 2008 sports action comedy film written and directed by the Wachowskis. It is based on the 1960s manga and anime series of the same name. Starring Emile Hirsch, Christina Ricci, John Goodman, Susan Sarandon, Matthew Fox, Roger Allam, Benno Fürmann, Hiroyuki Sanada, Rain and Richard Roundtree, the plot revolves around Speed Racer, an 18-year-old automobile racer who follows his apparently deceased brother's career, choosing to remain loyal to his family and their company Racer Motors, which causes difficulties after he refuses a contract that E.P. Arnold Royalton, owner of Royalton Industries, offers him.

A live action Speed Racer film had been in development hell since 1992, having changed actors and filmmakers until in 2006 when producer Joel Silver and the Wachowskis collaborated to begin production on Speed Racer as a family film. Speed Racer was shot in and around Potsdam and Berlin from June to August 2007. Michael Giacchino composed the film's score.

Speed Racer premiered on April 26, 2008 at the Nokia Theater, followed by its general theatrical release on May 9, 2008, by Warner Bros. Pictures. The film grossed $93 million worldwide on a $120 million budget, making it a commercial failure. It was subsequently nominated in multiple categories at the Teen Choice Awards as well as the Golden Raspberry Awards. Upon initial release, the film received mixed reviews, who praised the action sequences, musical score by Michael Giacchino, cinematography, and performances, critics were divided on its overuse of computer generated imagery, and criticized its screenplay and runtime. In subsequent years, Speed Racer has garnered a strong cult following with some commentators calling it "underrated" and a "misunderstood" film.

Plot 

Speed Racer is a young man whose life and love has always been automobile racing. His parents Pops and Mom run the independent Racer Motors, in which his brother Spritle and his pet chimp Chim Chim, his mechanic Sparky and his girlfriend Trixie are also involved. As a child, Speed idolized his record-setting older brother, Rex Racer, who was apparently killed while racing in the Casa Cristo 5000, a deadly cross-country rally race. Now embarking on his own career, Speed is quickly sweeping the racing world with his skill behind the wheel of his brother's Mach 5 and his own T-180 car the Mach 6, although primarily interested in the art of the race and the well-being of his family.

One day, E.P. Arnold Royalton, CEO of conglomerate Royalton Industries, offers Speed an astoundingly luxurious lifestyle in exchange for signing to race with him. Though tempted, Speed declines because his father's distrust of power-hungry corporations. Angered, Royalton reveals that for many years, key races have been fixed by corporate interests, including himself, to gain profits. Royalton takes out his anger on Speed by having his drivers force Speed into a crash that destroys the Mach 6 and suing Racer Motors for intellectual property infringement. Speed gets an opportunity to retaliate through Inspector Detector, head of an intelligence agency's corporate crimes division. Racer Taejo Togokahn supposedly has evidence that could indict Royalton but will only offer it up if Speed and the notorious masked Racer X agree to race on his team in the upcoming Casa Cristo 5000, which could also substantially raise the stock price of his family's racing business, blocking a Royalton-arranged buyout. Speed agrees but keeps his decision secret from his family, and Detector's team makes several defensive modifications to the Mach 5 to assist Speed in the race.

After they drive together and work naturally as a team, Speed begins suspecting that Racer X is actually Rex in disguise. His family discovers that he has entered the race and agree to support him, though Pops is angry with him for not asking permission to race earlier. With his family and Trixie aiding him, Speed defeats many brutal racers, who were bribed by fixer Cruncher Block to stop him, and overcomes seemingly insurmountable obstacles to win the race, while Detector's team arrests Block. However, Taejo's arrangement is revealed to be a sham, as he was only interested in increasing the value of his family's company to profit from Royalton's buyout. Enraged, Speed hits the track that he used to drive with his brother, and confronts Racer X with his suspicion that he is Rex. Racer X removes his mask, revealing an unfamiliar face, and tells Speed that Rex is indeed dead, but advises Speed to not let racing change the way he is and figure out his own driving. Speed returns home and plans to leave, but Pops expresses his pride in Speed's actions, and that he was wrong to not let Speed enter the race since his own stubbornness drove Rex away, before finding out about the race-fixing conspiracy. Taejo's sister Horuko unexpectedly arrives and gives him Taejo's rejected automatic invitation to the upcoming Grand Prix. The Racer family bands together and builds a new Mach 6 in 32 hours.

Speed enters the Grand Prix with the help of Inspector Detector against great odds; Royalton has placed a $1,000,000 bounty on his head that the other drivers are eager to collect, and he is pitted against future Hall of Fame driver Jack "Cannonball" Taylor. Speed overcomes a slow start to catch up with Taylor, who uses a cheating device called a spearhook to latch the Mach 6 to his own car. Speed uses his jump jacks to expose the device to video cameras, causing Taylor to crash. Speed wins the race, having successfully exposed Royalton's crimes. While Racer X watches, a flashback montage reveals that he really is Rex, having faked his death and undergone plastic surgery to change his appearance as part of his plan to protect Speed and the sport of racing. He chooses not to reveal his identity to his family, declaring that he must live with his decision. The Racer family celebrates Speed's victory as Speed and Trixie kiss, Taejo testifies against Royalton and Block, and Royalton is sent to jail.

Cast 

 Emile Hirsch as Speed Racer
 Nicholas Elia as young Speed Racer
 Christina Ricci as Trixie, Speed's girlfriend.
 Ariel Winter as young Trixie
 John Goodman as Pops Racer, Speed's father
 Susan Sarandon as Mom Racer, Speed's mother
 Matthew Fox as Racer X, a mysterious masked racer tasked with exposing the corruption undermining the WRL.
 Scott Porter as Rex Racer, Speed Racer's older brother and idol presumed to have been killed in a race
 Roger Allam as E.P. Arnold Royalton, the corrupt owner and CEO of Royalton Industries
 Paulie Litt as Spritle Racer, Speed's younger brother
 Benno Fürmann as Inspector Detector, head of the Corporate Crimes Division, Central Intelligence Bureau
 Hiroyuki Sanada as Mr. Musha, president and CEO of Musha Motors
 Rain as Taejo Togokahn, a rookie racer
 Richard Roundtree as Ben Burns, a race commentator and former racing champion
 Moritz Bleibtreu as Gray Ghost, a French racer of Eccran Establishment tasked with eliminating Speed
 Kick Gurry as Sparky, Speed's mechanic and best friend
 John Benfield as Cruncher Block, a professional race fixer and gang leader
 Christian Oliver as Snake Oiler, a shady racer who wears snakeskin racing clothes
 Ralph Herforth as Jack "Cannonball" Taylor, a superstar racer, WRL champion, 3 time Grand Prix winner, and future hall of famer sponsored by Royalton Industries
 Yu Nan as Horuko Togokahn, Taejo Togokhan's sister
 Nayo Wallace as Minx, a scientist and Racer X's girlfriend
 Melvil Poupaud as Johnny 'Goodboy' Jones, a race commentator
 Chim Chim, Spritle's pet chimpanzee and best friend is portrayed by two chimpanzees: "Kenzie" and "Willy".
 Togo Igawa as Tetsua Togokahn, Taejo and Horuko's father, and a corporate rival to both Royalton and Musha
 Joon Park as Kakkoi Teppodama, a Japanese racer for Musha Motors tasked with taking out Speed at the Grand Prix for a million dollars. He is credited as "Yakuza Driver" in the end credits.
Series original English dubbing artists Peter Fernandez and Corinne Orr appear as race announcers. Andres Cantor also makes a cameo as a Spanish language race announcer. Venezuelan professional racer Milka Duno also makes a cameo appearance as Kellie "Gearbox" Kalinkov, a Grand Prix racer who is tasked with eliminating Speed in exchange of collecting a bounty of a million dollars by Royalton.

Production

Development 
In September 1992, Joe Pytka announced that Warner Bros. held the option to create a live-action film adaptation of the 1960s Japanese anime and manga series Speed Racer, in development at Silver Pictures. In October 1994, singer Henry Rollins was offered the role of Racer X. In June 1995, Johnny Depp was cast into the lead role for Speed Racer, with production slated to begin the coming October, with filming to take place in California and Arizona. The following August, Depp requested time off to the studio for personal business, delaying production. However, due to an overly high budget, the same August, director Julien Temple left the project. Depp, without a director, also departed from the project. The studio considered director Gus Van Sant as a replacement for Temple, though it would not grant writing privileges to Van Sant. In December 1997, the studio briefly hired Alfonso Cuarón as director. In the various incarnations of the project, screenwriters Marc Levin, Jennifer Flackett, J. J. Abrams, and Patrick Read Johnson had been hired to write scripts.

In September 2000, Warner Bros. and producer Lauren Shuler Donner hired music video director Hype Williams to take the helm of the project. In October 2001, the studio hired screenwriters Christian Gudegast and Paul Scheuring for $1.2 million split between them to write a script for the film. Eventually, without production getting under way, the director and the writers left the project. In June 2004, Vince Vaughn spearheaded a revival of the project by presenting a take for the film that would develop the characters more strongly. Vaughn was cast as Racer X and was also attached to the project as an executive producer. With production never becoming active, Vaughn was eventually detached from the project.

Pre-production 

In October 2006, The Wachowskis were brought on board by the studio to write and direct the film. Producer Joel Silver, who had collaborated with the Wachowskis for V for Vendetta and The Matrix Trilogy, explained that they were hoping to reach a broader audience with a film that would not be rated R by the Motion Picture Association of America. Visual effects designer John Gaeta, who won an Academy Award for Best Visual Effects for the Wachowskis' The Matrix, was brought in to help conceive making Speed Racer into a live-action adaptation. Production was set to begin in summer 2007 in European locations for a summer 2008 release. In November 2006, the release date for it was set for May 23, 2008. Producer Joel Silver described Speed Racer as a family film in line with the Wachowskis' goal to reach a wider audience.

Casting 
While Joseph Gordon-Levitt, Shia LaBeouf and Zac Efron were originally considered for the role of Speed Racer, Emile Hirsch eventually won the role. When he prepared for the role, Hirsch watched every Speed Racer episode and visited Charlotte Motor Speedway (known as Lowe's Motor Speedway at the time), where he met with driver Jimmie Johnson. Elisha Cuthbert, Kate Mara and Rose McGowan were originally considered for the role of Trixie, the role was eventually given to Christina Ricci. Before Matthew Fox was cast as Racer X, Henry Rollins was originally considered for the role. Keanu Reeves was offered the role of Racer X, but he declined.

Filming 
In February 2007, the Wachowskis selected Babelsberg Studios in Potsdam, Germany to film. In the following March, Warner Bros. moved the release date two weeks earlier to May 9, 2008. The studio received a grant of $12.3 million from Germany's new Federal Film Fund, the largest yet from the organization, for its production in the Berlin-Brandenburg region. The amount was later increased to $13 million. Principal photography commenced on June 5, 2007 in Berlin, and was shot entirely against greenscreen, lasting 60 days. The Wachowskis filmed in high-definition video for the first time. With the camera, the Wachowskis used a layering approach that would put both the foreground and the background in focus to give it the appearance of real-life anime. The film has a "retro future" look, according to Silver. Filming concluded on August 25, 2007.

Music 

In 2007, the Wachowskis purchased the rights to the sound effects and theme song of the television series for use in the film. The film's soundtrack was composed by Michael Giacchino, performed by Hollywood Studio Symphony and released by Varèse Sarabande. It was used along with orchestral score; Warner Bros. added an updated version of the "Go Speed Racer Go" theme song, which plays during the end credits, and was produced by Ali Dee Theodore and Jason Gleed, and performed by Ali Dee and the Deekompressors. Razor & Tie released this version as an extended play on January 1, 2008 to promote the film's release, and as a single released along with film's soundtrack on May 6, 2008.

Animal cruelty incident 
During its production, animal rights group People for the Ethical Treatment of Animals (PETA) made allegations of animal cruelty against the film, reporting that one of the two chimpanzees used in the production was allegedly beaten after biting a child actor. The incident was confirmed by the American Humane Association (AHA) Animal Safety Representative on the set, who reported that the stand-in for the Spritle character portrayed by Litt had been bitten without provocation. The AHA representative also reported that "toward the end of filming, during a training session in the presence of the American Humane Representative, the trainer, in an uncontrolled impulse, hit the chimpanzee." The AHA Film Unit referred to this abuse as "completely inexcusable and unacceptable behavior in the use of any animal." The AHA placed Speed Racer on their "Unacceptable" list chiefly because of this incident and a separate case where five piranhas died of unexplained causes, with AHA noting "the aforementioned training incident tarnishes the excellent work of the rest of production" and that it "has no method of separating the actions of one individual in the employ of a production from the production as a whole."

Release

Marketing 
The Los Angeles Times estimated that nearly 5,000 Speed Racer film-related products were licensed by Warner Bros. The film was backed by multiple promotional partners with over $80 million in marketing support. The partners include General Mills, McDonald's, Target, Topps, Esurance, Mattel, Lego and Petrobras. The film also received support from companies outside of America in an attempt to attract international audiences. With early support before the film's release, the studio provided 3D computer models of the Speed Racer vehicle Mach 5 to the companies so they could accurately render the vehicle in their merchandise.

Mattel produced toys based on the film through several divisions. Hot Wheels produced die-cast vehicles, race sets and track sets. Tyco produced remote-controlled Mach 5s and racing sets. Radica Games produced video games in which players can use a car wheel, along with a cross-promotion with the video game U.B. Funkeys. The products became available in March 2008. Also, the Lego Company produced four Lego sets based on the movie. As part of the General Mills promotional tie-in, during the 2008 Crown Royal Presents the Dan Lowry 400, part of the 2008 NASCAR Sprint Cup season, the famous #43 Dodge Charger of Petty Enterprises was transformed into a NASCAR Sprint Cup Series version of the Mach 5, driven by Bobby Labonte.

Warner Bros., through its Interactive Entertainment division, self-published a video game based on the film titled Speed Racer: The Videogame, which was released on May 6, 2008 on the Nintendo DS and Nintendo Wii and on September 16, 2008 for the PlayStation 2. The original music for the Speed Racer video game was written by Winifred Phillips and produced by Winnie Waldron. The game was released on the Nintendo DS and Wii in May with the film's theatrical release and was released on the PS2 in the fall to accompany the film's DVD and Blu-ray release. Due to a short development schedule, the studio chose not to develop games for the PlayStation 3 and Xbox 360.

Home media 
Warner Home Video released Speed Racer on DVD and Blu-ray on September 16, 2008. The three-disc set features the main feature and supplemental features on the first disc, the DVD game "Speed Racer Crucible Challenge" on the second disc, and a digital copy of the film on the third disc—the last two being exclusive to the Blu-ray release. The U.S. DVD sales reached $6,268,301 and 390,191 copies in the first week, with consumer spending of $14,277,546 and 900,361 copies sold by 2013, and  grossed as of 2018. The Blu-ray version was re-released on May 18, 2010.

Reception

Box office 
Speed Racer premiered on April 26, 2008 during a $500,000-estimated event at the Nokia Theater in Los Angeles, where 4,000 people attended. It was released in regular theaters on May 9, 2008, grossing $18,561,337 in its opening weekend from around 6,700 screens at 3,606 theaters in the United States and Canada, ranking third at the box office behind Iron Man and What Happens in Vegas. In its second weekend it grossed $8,117,459 and ranked fourth at the box office. The film closed its run on August 1, 2008 with $43,945,766 domestically and $93,945,766 worldwide. Based on its total gross, it was considered a box office failure. The results were well below studio expectations, given that the production costs of Speed Racer were estimated to be over $120 million. Despite the low box office numbers, Warner Bros. remained optimistic about sales of associated products ranging from toys to tennis shoes. Brad Globe, president of Warner Bros. Consumer Products, expressed hope that "We're still going to do very well with Speed Racer", acknowledging that "a giant movie would have made it all a lot bigger".

Critical response 
The website's critics consensus says "Overloaded with headache-inducing special effects, Speed Racer finds the Wachowskis focused on visual thrills at the expense of a coherent storyline". Metacritic, which uses a weighted average, assigned the film a score of 37 out of 100 based on 37 critics, indicating "generally unfavorable reviews". Audiences polled by CinemaScore gave the film an average grade of "A−" on an A+ to F scale.

Writing for The Hollywood Reporter, Kirk Honeycutt called Speed Racer'''s visual effects "stellar", but stated it "proudly denies entry into its ultra-bright world to all but gamers, fanboys and anime enthusiasts". He criticized that story and character were "tossed aside" towards the "wearying" races. Todd McCarthy of Variety noted the target audience should be amused, but others might think the film "a cinematic pile-up", citing its implausibility and the lack of identifiable peril in the driving sequences. While noted viewers interested in CGI would appreciate it, McCarthy said the frame sometimes resembled "a kindergartner's art class collage". He had praise for the cinematography, the musical score, and the cast. Anime News Network's Zac Bertschy also praised the cast, while saying the story is "as anyone would expect", adding "the characters are all cardboard archetypes with Saturday Morning dialogue." Speed Racer "sets out to honor and refresh a youthful enthusiasm from the past and winds up smothering the fun in self-conscious grandiosity", declared The New York Times A. O. Scott.

Glenn Kenny of Premiere criticized the film's time-shifting narrative and multiple storylines, saying it "yields heretofore undreamed of levels of narrative incoherence". Kenny praised the film's look, saying the "cheez-whizziness" that others had criticised was "precisely the point". He remarked the movie inspires even more thinking than The Matrix because of its "blatantly anti-capitalist storylines". Similarly, The New Yorkers Anthony Lane said the film could still end up "bleached of fun" due to the theme mooted in The Matrix that all of us are being controlled. In Speed Racer, Lane argues, this comes in the form of villain Royalton, who "vows to crush [Speed] with 'the unassailable might of money.'" He concluded some people may call it entertaining, but he "felt [it] like Pop fascism". Jim Emerson, editor at the Chicago Sun-Times, wrote that Speed Racer "is a manufactured widget, a packaged commodity that capitalizes on an anthropomorphized cartoon of Capitalist Evil in order to sell itself and its ancillary products". It was said to be "the most tiresome piece of CGI" of the "past couple of years" at the time of film's release by Philip French, a The Guardian critic.

IGN's Todd Gilchrist gave a positive review, stating that Speed Racer "is not merely the best film that it could be, it's pretty much exactly what it should be: full of exciting, brilliantly-conceived races, primary-color characterizations and an irresistible sense of fun". He called Speed Racer "a masterpiece of its kind", praising "the special effects extravaganza" and "the moment when the Wachowskis went from wunderkind directors to true auteurs". Michael Phillips of the Chicago Tribune described Speed Racer as "buoyant pop entertainment and noted the Wachowskis respected "the themes of honor, dishonor, family loyalty and Visigoth-inspired barbarism behind the wheel" of the original work. The cast is praised as being "earnest" and "gently playful". However, he stated that "it sags in its midsection" with unnecessary dialogue. Although it was said to be among the worst films of the year by Rebecca Murray of About.com, she included Speed Racer on her list of "Top 10 Action Movies of 2008", stating "the action sequences are definitely eye-catching." Time magazine included Speed Racer on its list of "The All-Time 25 Best Sports Movies" and "Top 10 Movies of 2008". It said "Not every avant-garde FX masterpiece receives instant audience validation", described the film as "a rich, cartoonish dream: non-stop Op art, and a triumph of virtual virtuosity."

Roger Allam's portrayal of Arnold Royalton was praised; Variety said he made "a delicious love-to-hate-him villain". Time magazine critic Richard Corliss claimed that Allam was "channeling Brit pundit Christopher Hitchens as his most pompestuous"; similar comparisons were made by several other reviewers.

About the movie's reception, Christina Ricci said: "I think I was aware of the disconnect that was going on at the time, and I was sort of watching and… Not that I expected that, but I knew that there would be problems, because I knew that people were expecting something very different than what was actually going to be delivered."

The film has appeared periodically on lists of underrated films. Speed Racer was elected the third most underrated film of the 2000s by Den of Geek's N.P. Horton, which called it "a game-changing film which redefined and reconceptualised the film form as we know it." Nick Hyman, writing for Metacritic, included the film on its list of "movies that critics got wrong" calling it "a cult classic in the making". It was described as "nearly unmatched [...] insofar as action/adventure/family films go" by Alejandro Stepenberg from JoBlo.com, while Slates Chris Wade named it "an underrated masterpiece," stating that the Wachowskis "made a brilliant visual cartoon that dares to ask that you take it seriously." Annalee Newitz of io9 analyzed the ten reasons why they believe the film to be an "unsung masterpiece", including its visuals, humor, and political themes. Tor.com's Dexter Palmer considered the possibility that the film is a "misunderstood art film", highlighting its color scheme that is a "pleasure" and the fact it does not try to seem real. Palmer lauded it because he does not think films must imitate reality, and ultimately said it is "an extreme reminder of what films, and especially fantasy and science fiction films, can place on screen" and that it is "a refreshing change of pace" in film industry. Collider's Kayti Burt ranked it at #30 of Best Hollywood Blockbusters of the 21st Century stating, "While other blockbusters of the year (and the decade) worked to ground their fantastical premises in a gritty, realistic setting, Speed Racer leaned hard in the other direction."

 Accolades Speed Racer was nominated at the Golden Trailer Awards for "Summer 2008 Blockbuster", at the MTV Movie Award for "Best Summer Movie So Far", at the Motion Picture Sound Editors Golden Reel Award for "Best Sound Editing: Sound Effects and Foley in a Feature Film", at the Visual Effects Society Awards for "Outstanding Matte Paintings in a Feature Motion Picture". At the 2008 Teen Choice Awards, Speed Racer was a nominee in the category of "Movie: Action Adventure", "Movie Actor: Action Adventure" and "Movie Actress: Action Adventure". The film was also nominated for the 29th Golden Raspberry Awards in the category of Worst Prequel, Remake, Rip-off or Sequel.

 Possible sequel Variety discussed a possible sequel, saying it could happen if Speed Racer'' had a good box office performance. In 2008, the possibility was contemplated by the Wachowskis when Rain asked them why his character is so happy for Speed winning, and they replied it could be explained in the next film. Rain said he was hired for three years, while noting that is not a guarantee. Ricci also considered it a possibility; she stated "When we [the cast] were all leaving, we were like 'write the sequel!' 'We want to come back'. And they [the Wachowskis] were like, 'I know. I know. We're going to. Don't worry'", adding she would like more action scenes to her character. Producer Silver said that the Wachowskis "have a great story idea for a sequel" but that it is "a great idea for a sequel if it makes sense to make it.". In 2018, Hirsch stated in a tweet that a sequel script has been written.

Notes

References

External links 

 
 
 
 

2000s action comedy films
2000s sports comedy films
2000s teen comedy films
2008 comedy films
2008 films
American action comedy films
American auto racing films
American children's comedy films
American sports comedy films
American teen comedy films
Animal cruelty incidents in film
Babelsberg Studio films
2000s English-language films
German action films
German auto racing films
English-language German films
Films directed by The Wachowskis
Films produced by Grant Hill (producer)
Films produced by Joel Silver
Films produced by The Wachowskis
Films scored by Michael Giacchino
Films shot at Babelsberg Studios
Films shot in Berlin
Films with screenplays by The Wachowskis
IMAX films
Live-action films based on animated series
Live-action films based on manga
Silver Pictures films
Speed Racer
Sports action films
Village Roadshow Pictures films
Warner Bros. films
2000s American films
2000s German films